10 Color Singles is a compilation album released by High and Mighty Color on December 26, 2007. It comes in two editions, one featuring an additional DVD which contains most of the band's music videos.

Overview
10 Color single is the first "best" album from the group, containing their first 10 singles. The album will also be released with a special edition of "Ichirin no Hana" and is expected to contain a music video for Mushroom, a b-side from the single Dreams.

Promotion
To promote the album, a black van campaign was started. Information on where to purchase the album online and in person was posted on the side of a black van alongside the album's cover. The van drove through 10 different cities for three weeks promoting the sale of the album, making its final stop in Okinawa on the day of the release.

Track listing

References 

High and Mighty Color compilation albums
2007 greatest hits albums
Sony Music compilation albums
2007 video albums
High and Mighty Color video albums
Sony Music video albums
Japanese-language video albums
Japanese-language compilation albums
Music video compilation albums